A mental health counselor (MHC), or counselor (counsellor in British English), is a person who works with individuals and groups to promote optimum mental and emotional health. Such persons may help individuals deal with issues associated with addiction and substance abuse; family, parenting, and marital problems; stress management; self-esteem; and aging.  The United States Bureau of Labor Statistics distinguishes "Mental Health Counselors" from "Social Workers", "Psychiatrists", and "Psychologists".

Duties
The legal definition of a counselor, and hence the legal scope of practice, varies with jurisdiction. In some jurisdictions across the United States, counselors, marriage and family therapists, and psychologists have virtually identical definitions: evaluating and treating mental and behavioral disorders. In spite of such definitions, many mental health professionals reject the medical model (which assumes that clients are "disordered") in favor of broader viewpoints, such as those that emerged from systems psychology.

Service users
MHCs work with individuals, couples, families, and groups to address and treat emotional and mental disorders and to promote mental health. Most mental health counselors in the U.S. work in outpatient and residential care centers, individual and family services, and local governments. They are trained in a variety of therapeutic techniques used to address issues, including depression, anxiety, addiction and substance abuse, suicidal impulses, stress, problems with self-esteem, and grief. They also help with job and career concerns, educational decisions, issues related to mental and emotional health, and family, parenting, marital, or other relationship problems. Some career concerns include helping employees who have mental health conditions to manage  their health  condition  whilst adhering  to  organisational  demands  to  demonstrate  performance  and  commitment  to  their work.

MHCs also continue to play a growing role in the military mental health crisis, helping military personnel and their families deal with issues such as PTSD. MHCs often work closely with other mental health specialists, such as psychiatrists, psychologists, clinical social workers, psychiatric nurses, and school counselors.  Many mental health counselors look to help their clients have a concise whole body treatment plan that addresses all the needs of the client. In the United States, MHCs diagnose as well as treat mental illness, though the scope of practice for mental health practitioners varies from state to state.

Regulation

United States
Licensing requirements can vary depending on which state a mental health counselor practices in. Across the United States, mental health counseling licensure is required to independently practice, but can be practiced without a license if under close supervision of a licensed practitioner. Licensing titles for mental health counselors vary from state to state: Licensed Mental Health Counselor (LMHC), Licensed Professional Counselor (LPC), Licensed Professional Clinical Counselor (LPCC), and various forms of these titles may list differently per state statues. The title "Mental Health Counselor" (or variation thereof) is often a protected title and thus it may be a violation of state law for persons to hold themselves as such without a proper credential.

A licensed mental health counselor holds a minimum of a master's degree in counseling or another closely related field in mental health care. After obtaining a master's degree, mental health counselors complete two to three years (depending on various state statutes) of clinical work under the supervision of a licensed or certified mental health professional. The qualifications for licensure are similar to those for marriage and family therapists and for clinical social workers. Becoming a counselor and using it in daily life to help others to learn more about themselves is not a reason for someone to pursue a degree within this field. Ethics within this profession require the counselor to remain professional to be able to adequately treat patients. Remaining detached as the witness to a client's thought, feelings, and emotions can be a hard thing to do, but will ultimately reassure a patient that there are no judgement to what they will share. Guiding a patient to understand themselves and their choices is also another aspect of this profession.

See also
 List of counseling topics
 Mental health professional
 Psychotherapist
 Nonviolent communication
 Social worker
 Psychologist
 Psychiatrist
 Occupational therapist
 Expressive therapy
 Behavior therapy
 Cognitive behavioral therapy
 Rational emotive behavior therapy
 Dialectical behavioral therapy

References

Citations

General sources

 
 
 
 
 
 Prepared June 2008 by William J. Weikel. Ph.D., Howard Smith, Ed.D., Artis J. Palmo, Ph.D., and Edward Beck, Ed.D.

External links
 American Counseling Association
 American Mental Health Counselors Association
 

Mental health occupations
Counseling